Tesla wrote a number of books and articles for magazines and journals.
Among his books are My Inventions: The Autobiography of Nikola Tesla; The Fantastic Inventions of Nikola Tesla, compiled and edited by David Hatcher Childress; and The Tesla Papers.

Many of Tesla's writings are freely available on the web, including the article, The Problem of Increasing Human Energy, which he wrote for The Century Magazine in 1900, and the article, Experiments With Alternate Currents Of High Potential And High Frequency, published in his book, Inventions, Researches and Writings of Nikola Tesla.

Works
A New System of Alternate Current Motors and Transformers, AIEE Address, May 16, 1888
Phenomena of Alternating Currents of Very High Frequency, Electrical World, Feb. 21, 1891
Experiments with Alternate Currents of Very High Frequency and Their Application to Methods of Artificial Illumination, AIEE, Columbia College, N.Y., May 20, 1891
Experiments with Alternate Currents of High Potential and High Frequency, IEE Address, London, February 1892
On Light and Other High Frequency Phenomena, Franklin Institute, Philadelphia, February 1893, and National Electric Light Association, St. Louis, March 1893
On the Dissipation of the Electrical Energy of the Hertz Resonator, Electrical Engineer, Dec. 21, 1892
On Electricity, Electrical Review, January 27, 1897
High Frequency Oscillators for Electro-therapeutic and Other Purposes, Electrical Engineer, November 17, 1898
Plans to Dispense With Artillery of the Present Type, The Sun, New York, November 21, 1898
Tesla Describes His Efforts in Various Fields of Work, Electrical Review - New York, November 30, 1898
On Current Interrupters, Electrical Review, March 15, 1899
The Problem of Increasing Human Energy, Century Illustrated Monthly Magazine, June 1900
Tesla's New Discovery, The Sun, New York, January 30, 1901
Talking With Planets, Collier's Weekly, February 9, 1901
The Transmission of Electrical Energy Without Wires, Electrical World, March 5, 1904
Electric Autos, Manufacturers' Record, December 29, 1904
The Transmission of Electrical Energy Without Wires as a Means for Furthering Peace, Electrical World and Engineer, January 7, 1905
Tuned Lightning, English Mechanic and World of Science, March 8, 1907
Tesla's Wireless Torpedo, New York Times, March 19, 1907
Possibilities of Wireless, New York Times, Oct. 22, 1907
The Future of the Wireless Art, Wireless Telegraphy & Telephony, Van Nostrand, 1908
Mr. Tesla's Vision, New York Times, April 21, 1908
Nikola Tesla's New Wireless, The Electrical Engineer - London, December 24, 1909
Dr. Tesla Talks of Gas Turbines, Motor World, September 18, 1911
Tesla's New Monarch of Machines, New York Herald, Oct. 15, 1911
The Disturbing Influence of Solar Radiation On the Wireless Transmission of Energy, Electrical Review and Western Electrician, July 6, 1912
How Cosmic Forces Shape Our Destinies, New York American, February 7, 1915
Some Personal Recollections, Scientific American, June 5, 1915
The Wonder World To Be Created By Electricity, Manufacturer's Record, September 9, 1915
Nikola Tesla Sees a Wireless Vision, New York Times, Sunday, October 3, 1915
Tesla's New Device Like Bolts of Thor, New York Times, December 8, 1915
Wonders of the Future, Collier's Weekly, December 2, 1916
Electric Drive for Battle Ships, New York Herald, February 25, 1917
My Inventions, Electrical Experimenter, February–June and October 1919
Famous Scientific Illusions, Electrical Experimenter, February 1919
The True Wireless, Electrical Experimenter, May 1919
Electrical Oscillators, Electrical Experimenter, July 1919
World System of Wireless Transmission of Energy, Telegraph and Telegraph Age, October 16, 1927
Our Future Motive Power, Everyday Science and Mechanics, December 1931
Pioneer Radio Engineer Gives Views On Power, New York Herald Tribune, September 11, 1932
The Eternal Source of Energy of the Universe, Origin and Intensity of Cosmic Rays, New York, October 13, 1932
Tesla on Power Development and Future Marvels, New York World Telegram, July 24, 1934
The New Art of Projecting Concentrated Non-dispersive Energy Through Natural Media, 1935
A Machine to End War, Liberty, February 1935
Tesla Predicts Ships Powered by Shore Beam, New York Herald Tribune, May 5, 1935
Mechanical Therapy

Works About Tesla
The Tesla Effects With High Frequency and High Potential Currents, Introduction.--The Scope of the Tesla Lectures.
Tesla's Oscillator and Other Inventions, Century Illustrated Monthly Magazine, April 1895
Earth Electricity to Kill Monopoly, The World Sunday Magazine — March 8, 1896
Inventor Tesla's Plant Nearing Completion, Brooklyn Eagle, February 8, 1902
Nikola Tesla's New Wireless, The Electrical Engineer - London, December 24, 1909
Presentation of the Edison Medal to Nikola Tesla, May 8, 1917
Tesla's Views on Electricity and the War, The Electrical Experimenter, August 1917
Rain Can Be Controlled and Hydraulic Force Provided . . . , Syracuse Herald, ca. February 29, 1920
When Woman is Boss, Colliers, January 30, 1926
Nikola Tesla Tells of New Radio Theories, New York Herald Tribune, September 22, 1929
Tesla Cosmic Ray Motor May Transmit Power ‘Round Earth, Brooklyn Eagle, July 10, 1932
Tesla Invents Peace Ray, New York Sun, July 10, 1934
Dr. Tesla Visions the End of Aircraft In War, Every Week Magazine, October 21, 1934
Tesla Tries to Prevent World War II, Prodigal Genius, 1944 — Unpublished Chapter 34
A Story of Youth Told by Age, Written to Miss Fotitch Kristasia

Poems
From his childhood on Tesla wrote poetry but considered it too personal to be published. In the late 1920s, Tesla composed a poem—"Fragments of Olympian Gossip"—for his friend, George Sylvester Viereck, an illustrious German poet and mystic. It poked vitriolic fun at the scientific establishment of the day. For example, he derided Albert Einstein for claiming that matter and force are transmutable (Mass–energy equivalence), noting that Archimedes and Isaac Newton had stated that they are not.

Reference List/Bibliography

Notes

<ref>

Writings